Pelcis or Pelkis was a town of ancient Crete.

Its site is tentatively located near modern Kontokynigi.

References

Populated places in ancient Crete
Former populated places in Greece